Hayes Homestead, also known as Green Lawn Farm, is a historic home located in Newlin Township, Chester County, Pennsylvania. The original section was built about 1770, with a -story stone kitchen wing added about 1799, and two-story frame addition in 1882.  The original section is a two-story log structure with full basement and attic.  It has a gable roof and mammoth central stone chimney.

It was added to the National Register of Historic Places in 1985.

References

Houses on the National Register of Historic Places in Pennsylvania
Houses completed in 1770
Houses in Chester County, Pennsylvania
National Register of Historic Places in Chester County, Pennsylvania
1770 establishments in Pennsylvania